This is a list of fungicides. Chemical compounds used to kill fungus include:

0-9

A

B

C

D

E

F

G

H

I

K

L

M

N

O

P

Q

R

S

T

U

V

Z

See also

References

External links 
 Pesticide use in the United Kingdom
 Pesticide usage statistics for the United Kingdom
 Prevention and treatment of mold in library collections with an emphasis on tropical climates: A RAMP study, Ch. 5.1: Fungicides

Fungicides
Chemical compounds
Fungicides